Nicolas Chatelain (born 13 January 1970) is a male former international table tennis player from France.

He won a silver medal at the 1997 World Table Tennis Championships in the Swaythling Cup (men's team event) with Patrick Chila, Damien Eloi, Jean-Philippe Gatien and Christophe Legout for France.

He also won three European Table Tennis Championships medals in 1994, 1996 and 1998 and competed in the 1992 Summer Olympics.

See also
 List of table tennis players
 List of World Table Tennis Championships medalists

References

External links
 
 
 
 

1970 births
Living people
French male table tennis players
Olympic table tennis players of France
World Table Tennis Championships medalists
Table tennis players at the 1992 Summer Olympics